A Master of Studies in Law (M.S.L.), also known as a Master of Science of Law or Master of Legal Studies (M.L.S.) or Master of Science in Legal Studies (M.S.L.S.) or Master of Legal Studies (M.L.S.) Juris Master (J.M.) or Masters of Jurisprudence (M.J.) or Master in Law (M.L.), is a master's degree offered by some law schools to students who wish to study the law but do not want to become attorneys. M.S.L. programs typically last one academic year and put students through a similar regimen as first-year Juris Doctor (J.D.) students but may allow for further specialization. Despite having similar names, an M.S.L. is distinct from a Master of Laws (LL.M.), which is a postgraduate law degree.

A Juris Doctor degree is a "first professional doctorate", like an MD medical degree. Both consist of overview survey courses to familiarize the student with the overall field, e.g., one course in contracts, one course in real property, one course in family law, etc. Physicians normally do Graduate Medical Education (GME) in a "residency", which is where they get specialized training such as surgery or cardiology or pediatrics. Attorneys normally do not go on to specialized education but instead learn their particular field of law on the job at the first law firm they work for.  Basically, an LL.M. is the equivalent of majoring in a specific field of law with all courses taught at a college-senior honors program level—LL.M. programs typically are around 24 semester hours.

M.S.L. students may study such staples as constitutional law, torts, contracts, civil procedure, and other requirements alongside regular law students, writing the same papers and taking the same exams. But they typically graduate after accumulating two semesters of credit instead of six. Some M.S.L. programs are designed for academics who hold Ph.D.s in a discipline related to the law, and who want to add a legal dimension to scholarship. Other programs aim to provide fundamental legal education to professionals who are not lawyers, but whose careers involve legal or regulatory issues. Responding to this need, M.L.S. degrees are increasingly offered to working professionals on an online or part-time basis, and allow professionals to tailor elective law courses to their particular career fields. Currently, there are approximately 15 online programs available from accredited universities.

Overview
The degree has several variants, including a Master of Studies in Law degree (at Yale Law School, Northeastern University School of Law, The University of Iowa, University of Illinois at Urbana-Champaign,  the University of Pittsburgh, the University of Toronto, and the University of Western Ontario), for example, or a Master in the Study of Law (at Ohio State)  or Hamline University (www.hamline.edu), or a Master in Law (at the University of Pennsylvania Law School). Cornell Law School launched the Master of Science in Legal Studies (MSLS) program in January 2021.  This program is designed to provide a unique educational experience, which is often compared to an executive MBA program, but with a specific emphasis on business law.

In June 2015, Fordham University School of Law launched an M.S.L. with specializations in Corporate Compliance and Fashion Law. In March 2007 The Ohio Board of Regents approved M.S.L. Degree for the University of Dayton School of Law, and beginning in the Fall of 2014, Washburn University School of Law offers M.S.L. classes to individuals engaged in a wide range of parallel professions.  Drexel University offers a Master of Legal Studies program as of 2013. West Virginia University offers a Master of Legal Studies (M.L.S.) completely online as part of its nationally ranked Division of Public Administration. University of Washington School of Law offers a Masters of Jurisprudence in Employment and Human Resources, Environmental Regulation, Health Law, Indigenous Rights, Intellectual Property Law and Policy, Sustainable International Development Law, Tax Law, and Technology Law. Arizona State University also offers an M.L.S.  Seattle University School of Law offers a Master of Legal Studies degree as of 2016. The John Marshall Law School in Chicago, and the Albany Law School in New York, both offer M.S. degrees in several concentrations.  The Vermont Law School offers a Masters of Environmental Law and Policy (MELP) degree (formally known as the Master of Studies in Environmental Law (MSEL) degree). As of 2011, UC Hastings will be offering a Master of Studies in Law (MSL) and LLM in Law, Science and Health Policy programs together with the University of California, San Francisco.  Since 2004, Friends University has offered a Master of Studies in Business Law (MSBL). Santa Barbara & Ventura Colleges of Law introduced their Master of Legal Studies (M.L.S.) program entirely online in 2012, and can be completed in under two years. Willamette University College of Law in Oregon offers a one-year Master of Legal Studies (MLS) program designed for professionals whose job involves working within a legal or regulatory framework. Trinity Law School recently introduced an online MLS program that can be taken as a general degree or with one of five emphases, most of which focus on Christian topics such as bioethics, Church and Ministry Management, and Human Rights. Loyola University Chicago School of Law offers M.J. degrees in Children's Law & Policy (online), Compliance & Enterprise Risk Management (online), Health Law (online), and Rule of Law for Development.

From the mid-1970s until 2004, there was also a unique M.S.L. program at Yale Law School for journalists. The program was a competitive fellowship offered to three or four applicants a year, chosen by the university. Yale provided free tuition, and the fellows also received a living stipend provided originally by the Ford Foundation and later by the John S. and James L. Knight Foundation. A number of reporters who currently cover the Supreme Court or other law-related issues for major mainstream media organizations are former fellows, including Barbara Bradley of NPR (1994), Linda Greenhouse of the New York Times (1978), Charles Lane (journalist) of the Washington Post (1997), Neil A. Lewis of the New York Times (1979), Charlie Savage of the Boston Globe (2003), and Viveca Novak of Time Magazine (1986). The program lost its funding after the 2003–04 academic year when the Knight Foundation declined to renew its grant, but is still offered to doctoral students and graduates and journalists on a tuition basis. M.L.S programs offered through Stanford Law School and the University of Arizona's James E. Rogers College of Law provide the opportunity for interdisciplinary research as well as a foundational legal education in U.S. law. The University of Colorado Boulder offers an MSL degree in Ethics and Compliance, with the opportunity for a variety of specializations including: cyber-security/information privacy, health care, marijuana, and finance among some others.

Appalachian School of Law also offers a Juris Masters (J.M.) to students who complete their first full semester of full letter-graded course work (Typically after the completion of their second year of law school). Covering Contracts, Professional Responsibility, Property, Civil Procedure, All legal writing courses, Wills and Estates, Business Association or Agency/Corporations, Evidence, Constitutional Law, and Torts.

See also
Legum Doctor (LL.D.)
Doctor of Canon Law (J.C.D.)
Magister Juris
EMLE

Notes and references

External links
The Faculty of Law at the Bar Ilan University, Israel
The Faculty of Law at the  University of Haifa, Israel
The Faculty of Law at the University of Toronto, Canada
The Faculty of Law at the University of Pittsburgh, United States of America
 The Faculty of Law of Paris, France French courses

Laws, Master
Law degrees